Matěj Stropnický (born 18 September 1983) is a Czech left-wing politician, journalist, actor and former leader of Green party. His father is Martin Stropnický, actor and former Minister of Foreign Affairs.

Stropnický came out as gay on 19 October 2017, stating he was in a relationship with actor Daniel Krejčík.

References

External links
 Official website
 The interview with Matěj Stropnický in Naše pravda 

1983 births
Living people
Politicians from Prague
Czech politicians
Leaders of the Green Party (Czech Republic)
Czech journalists
Charles University alumni
Czech LGBT politicians
Czech gay men
Gay politicians